Vesnianka (also referred to as Hahilkа, Hailkа, Haivkа, Yahilkа, or Rohulkа) is a type of spring dance songs performed in the lands of present-day Ukraine which have been performed for thousands of years. While they pre-date Christianity, Christian missionaries altered many of the dances by incorporating Christian themes into the songs and poetry which accompany the dancing.

See also
Khorovod
Ukrainian dance

References

Ukrainian folk music
Ukrainian dances